is a railway station on the Chikuhō Main Line and Gotōji Line in Iizuka, Fukuoka, Japan, operated by Kyushu Railway Company (JR Kyushu).

Lines
Shin-Iizuka Station is served by the Chikuhō Main Line as well as the Gotōji Line, of which it is the western terminus.

Adjacent stations

History 
On 1 October 1897, the Chikuho Kogyo Railway, now renamed the Chikuho Railway, merged with the Kyushu Railway which undertook further expansion so that the track had reached Nagao (now  by 1901. On 15 June 1902, Shin-Iizuka was opened with the name Yoshiwa as an additional station on the track for freight only. After the Kyushu Railway was nationalized on 1 July 1907, Japanese Government Railways (JGR) took over control of the station. On 12 October 1909, the station became part of the Chikuho Main Line. On 10 May 1920, JGR upgraded Yoshiwa to a general station for both freight and passenger traffic. On 1 February 1935, the name of the station was changed to Shin-Iizuka. With the privatization of Japanese National Railways (JNR), the successor of JGR, on 1 April 1987, control of the station passed to JR Kyushu.

Passenger statistics
In fiscal 2016, the station was used by an average of 4,434 passengers daily (boarding passengers only), and it ranked 47th among the busiest stations of JR Kyushu.

See also
 List of railway stations in Japan

References

External links
  

Railway stations in Fukuoka Prefecture
Railway stations in Japan opened in 1902